"Zitti e buoni" is a song by Italian rock band Måneskin. It was produced by the band and Fabrizio Ferraguzzo, and won the Sanremo Music Festival and the Eurovision Song Contest 2021. The song was the band's commercial breakthrough in global music charts and topped the singles chart in several European countries. It peaked at number 17 on the UK Singles Chart; becoming the first Italian-language song in 30 years to enter the UK Top 20. It also reached top 10 of the Billboard Global Excl. US chart.

Background and release
"Zitti e buoni" was written and produced by all of Måneskin's members, along with Fabrizio Ferraguzzo, who is credited as the track's producer. The song's initial ballad version was written in 2016, but was gradually reworked into a rock song through the years. Måneskin spoke of the title as "referring to a cathartic anger, our anger transformed into something positive, which leads to change things". It was released on 3 March 2021 to digital download, streaming media, and Italian contemporary hit radio stations. On 7 May 2021, an acoustic version of the song was uploaded on YouTube.

Composition
"Zitti e buoni" was written in E minor, with Damiano David's vocals spanning from E3 to A5. As highlighted by critics, the lyrics represent a criticism aimed at the generations of adults (i.e. Baby Boomers) who do not understand or value the young adults who are invited by the quartet to not lower their heads, and to be the truest version of themselves. According to NME, "lyrically, the song deals in themes of 'challenging prejudices' and 'finding redemption' – ideas that lay at the core of Måneskin and their overall message". As described at Wiwibloggs, the song "is a manifesto for those who want to move forward by treasuring their uniqueness. Never mind who's talking (without knowing what they're saying)." The lyrics also reference the Greek myth of Icarus ("Con ali in cera alla schiena/Ricercherò quell'altezza"; "With wax wings on my back I'll seek that height").

Music video
The music video was directed by Simone Peluso, and premiered on 3 March 2021 via Måneskin's YouTube channel. By 27 March 2022, the video gathered 128 million views, with an additional 83 million views from the Eurovision Song Contest's YouTube channel. By 15 June, cumulative views surpassed 54 million.

Sanremo Music Festival
"Zitti e buoni" won the band the "Big Artists" section of the Sanremo Music Festival 2021 on 6 March 2021, winning almost one-third of demoscopic jury votes (32.97%), the highest press jury (35.16%), and public votes (53.53%) for an average score of 40.68%, ahead of Francesca Michielin and Fedez's "Chiamami per nome" (30.49%) and Ermal Meta's "Un milione di cose da dirti" (28.83%). Enrico Melozzi arranged and conducted the Sanremo Orchestra during their performance.

Eurovision Song Contest

The song represented Italy in the Eurovision Song Contest 2021, after it was chosen through the Sanremo Music Festival. As Italy is a member of the "Big Five", the song automatically advanced to the final, held on 22 May 2021 at the Rotterdam Ahoy in Rotterdam, Netherlands. Some lyrics of the song were changed between the Sanremo Festival and Eurovision because of profanity (words such as coglioni and cazzo were removed), to the band's displeasure but understanding the discussion on "common sense". The version performed for Eurovision also removes a part of the music in the introduction and second verse.

As the favorites for victory, on 22 May 2021 the song won the contest with a total of 524 points (318 from televoting and 206 from jury score), 25 points ahead of "Voilà" by French singer Barbara Pravi. The song received the maximum of 12 points from judges from Croatia, Georgia, Slovenia and Ukraine, and from Bulgarian, Maltese, Sammarinese, Serbian and Ukrainian televoters. In their reprise performance, Måneskin performed the uncensored version of the song. David remarked in his speech, "We just want to say to the whole Europe, to the whole world, rock 'n' roll never dies!"

It was the first time since Finland in Eurovision 2006 that a group had won the contest with an atypical contesting music genre, and it was Italy's first victory since Eurovision 1990. It was also the first time since Germany in Eurovision 2010 that a "Big Five" nation had won the contest. Except for David, the rest of the members became the first artists born after 2000 to win the Eurovision Song Contest. They received congratulations from the President, the Government, and the Italian media, where the win and a sense of joy were described as a reminiscence of the time when the Italy national football team won the 2006 FIFA World Cup.

Performance and reception

During the energetic performances in the semi-finals and finals, the band members wore custom-made glam rock leather outfits designed by Italian fashion brand Etro, and boots by Christian Louboutin.  The outfits were described as "Jimi Hendrix-meets Velvet Goldmine" by The New York Times. By 3 June 2021, the final performance had gathered more than 44 million views on YouTube, which by 15 June increased to 54 million, becoming the most watched live performance on the Eurovision official channel. The media also took note of the kiss exchanged among David, Raggi, and Torchio on the broadcast during the winners reprise performance at the end of the show, but as explained by David, it was a "spontaneous" gesture to challenge stereotypes and in support of the LGBT community.

Måneskin received widespread acclaim for the performance and song, with NME describing it as "undeniable rock stomper with a hint of Franz Ferdinand in its slick guitar riffs", and The Guardian stating that is refreshing to hear an "authentic and strutting rock sound... Damiano David's stream of Italian lyricism sounds sensually badass over it all" on such a stage and age of digital audio music." The band was praised by many Italian rock and pop artists like Vasco Rossi and Laura Pausini, and international rock artists like Alex Kapranos of Franz Ferdinand, Steven Van Zandt of Bruce Springsteen's E Street Band, and Simon Le Bon of Duran Duran. Rossi became especially fond of them, saying that they, along with him, are the last Italian rock rebels trying to make Italian rock to dispel the usual stereotype about Italian music. Morgan considered them as the excellence of current Italian rock who helped the genre come out of its inferiority complex.

Commercial performance
"Zitti e buoni" peaked at number two on the Italian Singles Chart and was certified quintuple platinum by FIMI. Immediately after winning Sanremo, it debuted at number 106 on the Billboard Global Excl. US chart, six spots under the Sanremo runner-up "Chiamami per nome". Immediately after winning Eurovision, it reached the Top 10 on the Spotify Global Chart, number one in many countries, and became the most-streamed Italian song ever in one day on the platform. On 27 May, it surpassed 45 million streams, which cumulatively increased to 100 million streams by mid-June. In the following charting week, on 28 May, the single began to enter the weekly charts across Europe, peaking in its chart run at number one in Finland, Greece, Lithuania, Netherlands and Sweden. It topped the UK Rock & Metal Singles Chart for seven consecutive weeks, and peaked at number 17 on the UK Singles Chart, being the highest-charting Eurovision winning song there since Måns Zelmerlöw's "Heroes" in 2015, and the first Italian-language song in 30 years to enter the UK Top 20 after Zucchero Fornaciari's "Miserere" in 1992. In the week of 5 June 2021, it debuted at number 26 on Billboard Global 200 and achieved a new peak of 11 on Billboard Global Excl. US The following week, the song reached new peaks of 22 and 10, respectively.

The song was certified quintuple platinum in Italy, double platinum in Greece, platinum in Belgium, Norway, Poland and Switzerland, and gold in Austria, Portugal, Spain and Sweden.

Track listing
Digital download / streaming media
 "Zitti e buoni" 3:12

Credits and personnel
Credits adapted from Tidal.
 Måneskin production:
 Damiano David songwriting, vocals
 Victoria De Angelis songwriting, bass
 Thomas Raggi songwriting, guitars
 Ethan Torchio songwriting, drums
 Fabrizio Ferraguzzo production

Charts

Weekly charts

Year-end charts

Certifications

Release history

Notes

References

External links
Acoustic version at Eurovision Song Contest channel on YouTube
First Semi-Final performance at Eurovision Song Contest channel on YouTube
Grand Final performance at Eurovision Song Contest channel on YouTube

2021 singles
Måneskin songs
Eurovision songs of 2021
Eurovision songs of Italy
2021 songs
Sanremo Music Festival songs
Sony Music singles
Eurovision Song Contest winning songs
Italian-language songs
Number-one singles in Sweden
Number-one singles in Greece
Number-one singles in Finland
Number-one singles in Poland
Songs written by Damiano David
Songs written by Victoria De Angelis